The following is a list of works about Philadelphia, Pennsylvania, U.S.

List of works, arranged chronologically

Published in the 18th century

Published in the 19th century

1800s–1840s
 City Directory. 1800; 1801; 1802; 1808; 1810; 1819; 1822; 1825; 1837; 1841; 1849

1850s–1890s
 
 City Directory. 1856; 1857; 1858; 1861; 1866
 
 
 
 
 
 
 
 
 
 
 
 
 
 
 
 
  + part 2. 1884-85

Published in the 20th century

1900s–1940s
 
 
 
 
 
 
 
 
 
 
 
 
 
 
 
 
 
 
 
 
 
 
 
      
 Joseph Jackson. Encyclopedia of Philadelphia. 1931
 
 Ellis Oberholtzer. Philadelphia: A History of the City and Its People. (4 vol 1936) online
 
 Bridenbaugh, Carl. Cities in the Wilderness-The First Century of Urban Life in America 1625–1742 (1938)  online
 Herman Collins. Philadelphia: A Story of Progress. (1941)

1950s–1990s
 Bridenbaugh, Carl.  Cities in Revolt: Urban Life in America, 1743–1776 (1955)
 
 
 
 Philadelphia the Fabulous City of Firsts. 1976.
 
 
 
 
 
 
 
 Ershkowitz, Herbert. John Wanamaker: Philadelphia Merchant (Signpost Biographies-Da Capo Press, 1999)

Published in the 21st century

 
 Giberti, Bruno. (2002) Designing the Centennial: a history of the 1876 International Exhibition in Philadelphia (University Press of Kentucky).
 
 Phillips, Anne E. (2005) "A history of the struggle for school desegregation in Philadelphia, 1955–1967." Pennsylvania History 72.1 : 49-76. online
 
 
 Arrigale, Lawrence M., and Thomas H. Keels. (2012) Philadelphia's Golden Age of Retail (Arcadia Publishing).
 Jordan, David M. (2012) Occasional Glory: The History of the Philadelphia Phillies (McFarland).
 
 
 Abigail Perkiss, (2014). Making Good Neighbors: Civil Rights, Liberalism, and Integration in Postwar Philadelphia. Ithaca, NY: Cornell University Press.
 Adams, James H. (2015). Urban Reform and Sexual Vice in Progressive-Era Philadelphia: The Faithful and the Fallen. Lanham, MD: Lexington.
 Wilson, Arthur Herman. (2017) A History of the Philadelphia Theatre, 1835-1855 (University of Pennsylvania Press).
 Golden, Janet, and Charles E. Rosenberg. (2017) Pictures of health: A photographic history of health care in Philadelphia, 1860-1945 (University of Pennsylvania Press.)
 Harris, Michael C. (2020) Germantown: A Military History of the Battle for Philadelphia, October 4, 1777 (Savas Beatie).

See also
 History of Philadelphia
 Timeline of Philadelphia

Philadelphia
Philadelphia-related lists
History of Philadelphia
philadelphia